College Kumaran is a 2008 Malayalam film directed by Thulasidas, written by Suresh Poduval starring Mohanlal, Siddique, Balachandra Menon and Vimala Raman .

Plot 
Kumaran, or as students call him, Captain (Mohanlal), was the star of Mahatma college before he joined the army. Now an ex-military officer, Kumaran is running the canteen of Mahatma College after a tragic incident that took his father and sister's life. 
Kumaran is dear to all the students and he actively engages with them, whether in youth festivals, love affairs, fights, or campus tours. He even helps them bring teachers back from their private tuition classes to the college.

Madhavi (Vimala Raman), the college's English professor, hates him because she saw Kumaran getting involved in a fight with a street rowdy and making her to come late on her joining day. Once during a campus tour, the bus gets involved in an accident, killing several students. Madhavi tells everyone that Kumaran was the reason for the accident. The rest of the movie is about Kumaran's attempts to prove his innocence and how he regains the trust of  his fellow students and of Madhavi. Later Madhavi realizes that Kumaran is the one who helped her to achieve her this position of an English teacher by remitting the amount required after she became orphan.
It is also revealed by Kumaran that ex education minister Sethunathan (Siddique), who after thrown out from power decided destroy the faith on Kumaran from both the management and the students. So Sethunathan made the bus accident and puts the blame on Kumaran. Kumaran even reveals the incident that happened to his father and sister was well planned by Sethunathan as his father witnessed Sethunathan sexually harassing a girl in the college canteen and he planned to report it to the management. So Sethunathan killed Kumaran's father and sister with the help of the watchman Vasooty (T. P. Madhavan) and made it as an accident. After revealing the truth, the students tries to kill Sethunathan but he takes a gun and threatens to kill them if they come forward. Kumaran fights with Sethunathan and defeats him. As he was about to kill Sethunathan, he stops as it was a college and leaves him. Kumaran tells him to go to the jail.

After proving his innocence, Kumaran plans to goes back but the college principal, college manager and Madhavi's uncle tells him to not go and they need him to take care of the college as the next college manager. Kumaran tells that he will be in the college as College Kumaran.

Cast 
Mohanlal as Canteen Kumaran / Captain Sreekumar
Siddique as Minister Sethunathan
Balachandra Menon as Narayanan, Madhavi's uncle
Janardhanan as V. Narendranath, College Principal
Nedumudi Venu as Sivaraman Nair
Vimala Raman as Madhavi Menon
Suraj Venjaramoodu as Bhargavan, Kumaran's Aide
Harisree Ashokan as Valsan, Kumaran's Aide
Saiju Kurup as SI Raghu
Vijayaraghavan as CI Issac
Babu Namboothiri as Karunakaran Nair, Kumaran's father 
Sruthi Lakshmi as Radha, Kumaran's sister
Jagannatha Varma as Judge Pillai
Kalasala Babu as Chandrasekharan, Public Prosecutor	
T. P. Madhavan as Vasooty / Vasudevan Muthalali	
Mukundan as Doctor Kasim Haji
Rizabawa as Vikraman, Maths lecturer
Baiju as Santhosh, Sethunathan's Party Person
Suresh Krishna as Xavier Kurishinkal 
Adithya Menon as Kannappan
Anil Murali
Kochu Preman as Sudhakaran
Prasanth Alexander
Arun V. Narayan
Murali Mohan
Vimal Raj as Bike Baby
Shamna Kasim as Sreekutty
Manka Mahesh as Vidya, Sivaraman Nair's wife
Valsala Menon as Lakshmi, Sivaraman Nair's mother
Ambika Mohan as Deepa, College Lecturer
KPAC Leelamani as Chithra, College Lecturer
Suja Menon as Veena Warrier
Sajitha Betti as Shalini
Surya Mohan as Shalini's friend
Bindu Murali as Hostel Matron
Maya Moushmi as Lathika, Sethunathan's wife
Chaya Govind as Indhu Udayakumar
Jija Surendran as Parent

Soundtrack
Music: Ouseppachan, Lyrics: Shibu Chakravarthy.

References

External links 
 
 
 http://www.rediff.com/movies/2008/feb/04ssck.htm

2008 films
2000s Malayalam-language films
Films shot in Thiruvananthapuram
Films directed by Thulasidas
Films scored by Ouseppachan